Herea is a Romanian surname. Notable people with the surname include:

Claudiu Herea (born 1990), Romanian footballer
Florina Herea (born 1979), Romanian swimmer
Ovidiu Herea (born 1985), Romanian footballer

Romanian-language surnames